Eliane Hugentobler (born 30 September 1981 in Zürich) is a Swiss ice dancer. With brother Daniel Hugentobler, she is the 1998-2002 Swiss national champion. They competed at the 2002 Winter Olympics, where they placed 14th. The Hugentoblers were coached by Natalia Linichuk and Gennadi Karponosov.

Programs

Results
(ice dance with Daniel Hugentobler)

References

External links
 

Swiss female ice dancers
Olympic figure skaters of Switzerland
Figure skaters at the 2002 Winter Olympics
Living people
1981 births